{{DISPLAYTITLE:C13H18N2O2}}
The molecular formula C13H18N2O2 may refer to:

 4-Hydroxy-5-methoxydimethyltryptamine, also known as 4-HO-5-MeO-DMT or psilomethoxin
 Methoxypiperamide

Molecular formulas